Lucy Martin (born 5 May 1990) is a British retired professional road and track cyclist.

Career
Martin was born in Whiston, Merseyside and grew up in Widnes, Cheshire where she attended Riverside College.

In 2011, Martin was signed by the  women's team as one of four British riders. She competed at the 2012 Summer Olympics in the Women's road race.

In August 2015 Martin announced her immediate retirement from competition. She subsequently joined  from 2016, working on the team's digital content and PR, and she also works as a commentator on professional cycling.

Major results
Source:

2007
 National Junior Track Championships
2nd Individual pursuit
3rd Points race
3rd Scratch
2008
 1st  Road race, National Junior Road Championships
 2nd  Points race, 2008–09 UCI Track Cycling World Cup Classics, Manchester
 2nd Points race, National Junior Track Championships
 3rd Scratch, National Track Championships
2009
 6th Sparkassen Giro Bochum
2010
 8th Drentse 8 van Dwingeloo
 9th Overall Trophée d'Or Féminin
2011
 2nd Road race, National Under-23 Road Championships
 10th Overall Tour of Chongming Island Stage race
2012
 8th Tour of Chongming Island World Cup
 9th Omloop van het Hageland
2013
 7th Knokke-Heist – Bredene
2015
 5th Trofee Maarten Wynants

References

External links

1990 births
Living people
English track cyclists
Sportspeople from Widnes
People from Whiston, Merseyside
Cyclists at the 2012 Summer Olympics
Olympic cyclists of Great Britain
English female cyclists
Cyclists at the 2010 Commonwealth Games
Commonwealth Games competitors for England